Miss República Dominicana 1998 was held on December 12, 1997. There were 20 candidates, representing provinces and municipalities, who entered. The winner would represent the Dominican Republic at Miss Universe 1998 . The first runner up would enter Miss World 1998. The second runner up would enter in Miss International 1998. The rest of finalist entered different pageants.

Results

Special awards

 Miss Rostro Bonito - Selinée Méndez (Monseñor Nouel)
 Miss Photogenic (voted by press reporters) - Katherine Ferreira (Jarabacoa)
 Miss Belleza Rondinella - Sharmin Díaz (San Pedro de Macorís)
 Miss Congeniality (voted by Miss Dominican Republic contestants) - Joan Alcantara (San Francisco de Macorís)
 Best Provincial Costume - Tatiana Silvestre (Duvergé)
 Miss Elegancia - Selinée Méndez (Monseñor Nouel)

Delegates

Trivia
Merfry Then would enter again in Miss Universe Dominican Republic 2001.

References

Miss Dominican Republic
1998 beauty pageants
1998 in the Dominican Republic